Vilsund Bridge (Vilsundbroen) is a bascule arch bridge that crosses Vilsund between Mors and Thy in northwestern Jutland, Denmark. The bridge is 382 metres long, and the longest span is 30 metres.

Vilsund Bridge was designed by Anker Engelund. Construction started in 1937, and the bridge was opened on 16 July 1939.

See also 
 Sallingsund Bridge, connecting Mors and Salling
 List of bridges in Denmark

External links
A page about Vilsund Bridge 
Another page about the bridge and Vilsund 
Pictures of Vilsund Bridge
Picture and data about the bridge
A picture of the bridge
http://home.no.net/lotsberg/data/danmark/bru.html
 

Bridges in Denmark
Arch bridges in Denmark
Bascule bridges
Road bridges in Denmark
Bridges completed in 1939
1939 establishments in Denmark
Morsø Municipality
Thisted Municipality
Limfjord